Brown is an unincorporated community in Bienville Parish, Louisiana, United States.

History
Brown was named for George W. Brown, the original owner of the town site.

References

Unincorporated communities in Bienville Parish, Louisiana
Unincorporated communities in Louisiana